Ahmed Barman Ali Barman Shamroukh Hammoudi (born 5 February 1994) is an Emirati footballer who currently plays as a midfielder for Al Ain FC.

International goals 
Scores and results list the United Arab Emirates' goal tally first.

Honours 
Al Ain
Winner
 UAE Arabian Gulf League: 2011–12, 2012–13
 UAE President's Cup: 2013–14
 Arabian Gulf Super Cup: 2013

Runners-up
 Arabian Gulf Super Cup: 2014

References

External links 
 

1994 births
Living people
Emirati footballers
Dibba FC players
Al Ain FC players
Association football midfielders
UAE Pro League players
United Arab Emirates international footballers